Yang Qianyu (born 7 March 1993) is a Hong Kong road and track cyclist, who most recently rode for UCI Women's Continental Team . She represented her nation at the 2015 UCI Track Cycling World Championships.

Major results

Track

2013
 2nd Points race, ACC Track Asia Cup – Thailand Round
2014
 Hong Kong International Track Cup (January)
1st Team pursuit (with Meng Zhaojuan, Pang Yao and Jamie Wong)
2nd Individual pursuit
3rd Points race
 Hong Kong International Track Cup (November)
1st Individual pursuit
2nd Points race
3rd Scratch
 Asian Track Championships
2nd  Scratch
3rd  Team pursuit (with Pang Yao, Meng Zhaojuan and Jamie Wong)
2015
 Asian Track Championships
2nd  Individual pursuit
2nd  Team pursuit (with Leung Bo Yee, Meng Zhaojuan and Pang Yao)
 2nd Omnium, Japan Track Cup
2016
 Track Clubs ACC Cup
1st Scratch
1st Team pursuit (with Leung Bo Yee, Leung Wing Yee and Pang Yao}
 2nd  Individual pursuit, Asian Track Championships
 3rd  Scratch, 2015–16 UCI Track Cycling World Cup, Hong Kong
2017
 2nd  Scratch, 2017–18 UCI Track Cycling World Cup, Manchester
 2nd  Team pursuit, Asian Track Championships (with Diao Xiaojuan, Leung Bo Yee and Pang Yao)
2018
 2nd  Madison, Asian Games (with Pang Yao)
2019
 1st  Madison, 2020 Asian Track Cycling Championships (with Pang Yao)

Road
Source: 

2013
 2nd Road race, National Road Championships
2014
 National Road Championships
2nd Road race
3rd Time trial
2015
 National Road Championships
2nd Road race
2nd Time trial
 8th Overall Tour of Zhoushan Island
2016
 National Road Championships
1st  Time trial
2nd Road race
 1st Overall Tour of Thailand
1st Stage 3
 5th Horizon Park Women Challenge
 6th Road race, Asian Road Championships
 7th VR Women ITT
2017
 Asian Road Championships
1st  Road race
4th Time trial
 1st  Road race, National Road Championships
2018
 National Road Championships
1st  Time trial
2nd Road race
 4th Road race, Asian Games
 6th Road race, Asian Road Championships
2019
 National Road Championships
1st  Road race
2nd Time trial
 2nd China Scenic Avenue I
 3rd  Team time trial, Asian Road Championships

References

External links

1993 births
Hong Kong female cyclists
Living people
Asian Games medalists in cycling
Cyclists at the 2018 Asian Games
Medalists at the 2018 Asian Games
Asian Games silver medalists for Hong Kong